Karkh is a town and tehsil headquarters in Khuzdar District, in the Pakistani province of Balochistan.

The harmlees way leads to Moola Chotok Waterfall from Khuzdar via Karakh town. The boys high school of Karkh town has been uprated for higher Secondary education level and girls primary school Karakh town has been upgraded up to middle school level.

References 

Geography of Balochistan, Pakistan